"Luce (Tramonti a nord est)" (translating to "Light (Sunsets in the North-East)") is Italian singer-songwriter Elisa's most famous song, both in her home Italy and internationally, in its English version "Come Speak to Me". It also has a Spanish version called "Háblame", which has a slightly different arrangement. It was Elisa's first song in Italian, even though she had already released two albums in English.

It was heard for the first time in the 2001 edition of the Sanremo Festival, winning first place, defeating the entry by the favorite Giorgia, as well as the Mia Martini Critics award and the radio and TV award; Elisa won the best singer award in that same event. The music was written by Elisa, as well as the English lyrics, which are actually the original lyrics. But to take part in Sanremo Festival, the lyrics had to be presented in Italian, so she asked for the help of rocker Zucchero. It is heavily influenced by Björk, with references to Peter Gabriel during the chorus bassline. The arrangement is one of the most complex and dazzling in all of Italian music. There is a vocal mantra which runs throughout the entire song.

"Luce (tramonti a nord est)" is available as a single, as well as in the repacking of Elisa's second album Asile's world in both Italian and English versions. The latter was also available in Elisa's international compilation of her first three albums, which in some countries contains the Spanish version. It was later featured in Elisa's acoustic album Lotus, with a remarkably different arrangement. The song is included in Elisa's greatest hits album "Soundtrack" in its Italian version.

The single was certified gold by the Federation of the Italian Music Industry.

Track list
"Luce (tramonti a nord est)" (E. Toffoli, A. Fornaciari) (4:24)
"Come speak to me" (E. Toffoli) (4:23)
"Asile's world" [Bedroom Rockers remix] (E. Toffoli, L. Bafunno) (3:39)

Chart performance

Cover versions
Raphael Gualazzi performed a cover of the song during the "Sanremo Story" round of the Sanremo Music Festival 2013. His cover was included as a bonus track on the international deluxe edition of the album Happy Mistake. Michele Zarrillo recorded the song for the album Vivere e rinascere – Passioni in 2014.

References

External links
 Official International Website

2001 singles
Elisa (Italian singer) songs
Italian-language songs
Number-one singles in Italy
Songs written by Elisa (Italian singer)
Sanremo Music Festival songs
2000 songs
Sugar Music singles